This article contains synopses for the recurring characters that have appeared on the American soap opera As the World Turns.

Al James
(Late 1950s)
He is one of Penny Hughes' classmates who taunted her and her ex, Jeff Baker. Jeff got into a fight with Al and killed him. Jeff was put on trial, and was cleared of the murder.

Tom Pope
(Late 1950s-Early 1960s)
An attorney, and Penny Hughes' boyfriend, Tom was beloved by her family. He was engaged to her, but when he heard Jeff Baker declare his love for her he released her from the engagement and later left town.

Mitchell Dru
(Late 1950s-Early 1960s)
Mitchell was an attorney with his own law firm.

Greg Williams
(Late 1950s-Early 1960s)
Greg was an ambitious reporter who was always looking for stories.

Julie Spencer
(Late 1950s-Early 1960s)
Julie was a young attorney, and Mitchell Dru's ward.

Burt Stanton
(Late 1950s)
Burt was Ellen Lowell's boyfriend.  He was set up by Jeff Baker and broke up with Ellen when she said she had a child.

Laura March
(Early 1960s)
Laura was a secretary at Memorial Hospital after Edith Hughes left town.

Phil Banner
(Early 1960s)
Phil was a valued employee during the time that Jeff Baker was a piano player.

Ed Richardson
(Early 1960s)
Grace Baker's right-hand man, Ed helped Jeff Baker in the music business.

Dr. Joe and Anne Meadows
(Late 1950s-Early/Mid 1960s)
These two friends of Doug Cassen helped out Ellen Lowell when she was pregnant.

Louise Cole
(1958)
Tim Cole's first wife, Louise divorced him at his request.  She was portrayed by Mary K. Wells.

Dick and Grace Baker
(Late 1950s-Early 1960s)
Dick and Grace were Jeff Baker's parents.

Thelma Turner
(Mid 1950s-Early 1960s)
Thelma was Janice Turner's mother.

Carl Whipple
(Late 1950s-Early 1960s)
Carl was Janice Turner's husband, and the father of Debbie and Alice Whipple.

Dr. George Frey
(Late 1950s-Early 1960s)
Dr. Frey was Edith Hughes' husband.

Notes

 
Lists of soap opera characters by series